Museum of Furuta Oribe (古田織部美術館) is a museum in Kita-ku, Kyoto, dedicated to works of Lord Furuta Oribe.

External links 
 Homepage of the Museum of Furuta Oribe

Museums in Kyoto